Broughia is an extinct genus of neopterygian ray-finned fish that lived during the Induan age of the Early Triassic epoch in what is now Greenland.

See also

 Prehistoric fish
 List of prehistoric bony fish

References

Parasemionotiformes
Early Triassic fish
Prehistoric animals of Madagascar
Fossils of Greenland
Prehistoric ray-finned fish genera